Unit may refer to:

Arts and entertainment
 UNIT, a fictional military organization in the science fiction television series Doctor Who
 Unit of action, a discrete piece of action (or beat) in a theatrical presentation

Music
 Unit (album), 1997 album by the Australian band Regurgitator
 The Units, a synthpunk band

Television
 The Unit, an American television series
 The Unit: Idol Rebooting Project, South Korean reality TV survival show

Business
 Stock keeping unit, a discrete inventory management construct
 Strategic business unit, a profit center which focuses on product offering and market segment
 Unit of account, a monetary unit of measurement
 Unit coin, a small coin or medallion (usually military), bearing an organization's insignia or emblem
 Work unit, the name given to a place of employment in the People's Republic of China

Science and technology

Science and medicine
 Unit, a vessel or section of a chemical plant
 Blood unit, a measurement in blood transfusion
 Enzyme unit, a measurement of active enzyme in a sample
 Equivalent (chemistry), a unit of measurement used in chemistry and biology
 Geological unit or rock unit, a volume of identifiable rock or ice
International unit, a unit of measurement for nutrients and drugs
 Unit of measurement, a definite magnitude of a physical quantity, defined and adopted by convention or by law
International System of Units (SI), modern form of the metric system
English units, historical units of measurement used in England up to 1824
Humorous units of measurement Some less serious or controversial units
Unit of length
Astronomical unit, a unit of length roughly between the Earth and the Sun
Natural unit, a physical unit of measurement
 Unit type, a type allowing only one value in type theory
 Unit of alcohol, a measure of the volume of pure ethanol in an alcoholic beverage

Computing
 Central processing unit, the electronic circuitry within a computer that carries out the instructions of a computer program
 GNU Units, a software program for unit conversion
 Rack unit, a unit of measure most commonly used to define the size of certain computing equipment

Mathematics
 Unit (ring theory), an element that is invertible with respect to ring multiplication
 Unit, identity element
 Unit, a tuple of length 0; an empty tuple
 Statistical unit, a data point on which statistical analysis is performed
 Unit angle, a full turn equal to an angle of 1
 Unit circle, a circle with a radius of length 1
 Unit cube, a cube with sides of length 1
 Unit fraction, a reciprocal of a positive integer
 Unit imaginary number, square root of negative 1   
 Unit impulse, an impulse of height 1
 Unit interval, an interval of distance 1
 Unit matrix, a diagonal matrix such that all elements on the main diagonal are 1 and all the others are zero
 Unit number, the number 1
 Unit round-off, an upper bound on the relative error due to rounding in floating point 
 Unit set, a singleton, a set with exactly 1 element
 Unit sphere, a sphere with a radius of length 1
 Unit square, a square with sides of length 1
 Unit vector, a vector with length equal to 1

Military
 Active service unit, the former Provisional Irish Republican Army cell
 Military unit, an homogeneous military organization whose administrative and command functions are self-contained
 Sayeret Matkal (The Unit), the Israeli special forces unit

Other uses
 Unit (Cristian Fleming) (born 1974), electronic musician based in New York City
 Unit (housing), a self-contained suite of rooms within a set of similar dwellings
 Unit (Norway), a government directorate
 Unit, course credit at a school or other educational institution
 Multiple unit, self-propelled train carriage capable of coupling other units of the same type

See also
 Unit testing, a method by which individual units of source code are tested
 Head unit, a component of a stereo system mounted inside of a vehicle
 Air unit (disambiguation)
 Piece (disambiguation)
 Subunit (disambiguation)
 UNITA, the second-largest political party in Angola
 Unite (disambiguation)
 Unity (disambiguation)
 United (disambiguation)